Promalactis dierli is a moth of the family Oecophoridae. It is found in the Tibet Autonomous Region of China and in Nepal.

The wingspan is about 14.5 mm.

References

Moths described in 2000
Oecophorinae